State Route 598 (SR 598) is a primary state highway in the U.S. state of Virginia. Known as East River Mountain Road, the state highway runs  from Interstate 77 (I-77) and U.S. Route 52 (US 52) near Rocky Gap north to the West Virginia state line near Bluefield, West Virginia, where the highway continues as West Virginia Route 598 (WV 598). SR 598 is the old alignment of US 52 on East River Mountain in far northern Bland County.

Route description

SR 598 begins at a partial cloverleaf interchange with I-77 and US 52. The interchange is along the lower slopes of East River Mountain, down which the roadway continues as US 52 (Scenic Highway) toward the hamlet of Rocky Gap in the narrow valley to the south of the mountain. I-77 and US 52 run concurrently north from the interchange into the East River Mountain Tunnel into West Virginia. SR 598 heads west as a two-lane undivided road that curvaceously ascends the mountain without the benefit of climbing lanes. The state highway reaches its northern terminus on the ridgeline of the mountain, which serves as the Virginia – West Virginia state line. The roadway continues west as WV 598 (Bland Road) and descends the north side of the mountain into the city of Bluefield.

Major intersections

References

External links

Virginia Highways Project: VA 598

598
State Route 598